Caroline Wittrin (born December 10, 1968) is a retired hammer thrower from Canada. She set her personal best throw (63.47 metres) on July 19, 1999 at a meet in Flagstaff, Arizona.

Achievements

References

1968 births
Living people
Canadian female hammer throwers
Athletes (track and field) at the 1998 Commonwealth Games
Athletes (track and field) at the 1999 Pan American Games
Commonwealth Games medallists in athletics
Commonwealth Games bronze medallists for Canada
Pan American Games medalists in athletics (track and field)
Pan American Games bronze medalists for Canada
Medalists at the 1999 Pan American Games
Medallists at the 1998 Commonwealth Games